Tavagnasco is a comune (municipality) in the Metropolitan City of Turin in the Italian region Piedmont, located about  north of Turin.  

Tavagnasco borders the following municipalities: Settimo Vittone, Quincinetto, Traversella, Brosso, and Quassolo.

References

Cities and towns in Piedmont